The Galata Monastery is a Romanian Orthodox monastery for nuns, founded at the end of the sixteenth century by Moldavian Voivode Petru Şchiopul, in the west of Iaşi, Romania. The monastery is located on the top of Galata Hill, and can be easily observed from different locations of Iasi. The church, surrounded by walls with loopholes and provided with a bell tower at the entrance, looks like a fortress, often serving as a place of defense and sometimes as a royal residence. Near the church on the hill, are places that provide panoramic views over the city.

Galata Monastery is listed in the National Register of Historic Monuments.  and consists of the following 4 buildings: 
 Church "Resurrection" - dating from the period 1582-1583 
 Prince's Palace - dating back to 1726-1728 
 The bell tower - dating back to 1584 
 The fortified wall - dating from 1584

History

Galata from the Valley (Galata din Vale) 
Before building the existing monastery, Voivode Petru Schiopul founded a monastery, named Galata from the Valley. Its name comes from the neighborhood with the same name from Constantinople (today's Istanbul), where Romanian Rulers used to find shelter when they went to the “Sublime Porte”.

In the summer of 1577, in its first reign, the Voivode sent a letter to the leaders of Bistrita in which he requested specialists in construction, being dissatisfied by the Moldavian constructors. Therefore, it can be concluded that the construction of the monastery began in autumn 1577. It is assumed that the monastery consecration ceremony took place before February 22, 1578, when the ruler and the metropolitan bishops have constituted its main patrimony. The chronicler Grigore Ureche also wrote in his books about the foundation of the monastery in 1578.

Unfortunately, given the fact that land on which was situated was unstable, the monastery walls were crumbling. The bell from the old church still resist in the yard of the existing monastery.

Monastery Foundation 
Following the demolition of the first church, the Voivode founded a second church on a hill near the city, overlooking the Nicolina river valley. Church (which has been dedicated to "Resurrection" and was known as the "Galata of the Hill") was built between 1582-1584 and was consecrated in 1584.

References

External links

 Churches and monasteries in Iaşi at Iași City Hall website

Historic monuments in Iași County
Romanian Orthodox churches in Iași
Romanian Orthodox monasteries of Iași County
Christian monasteries established in the 16th century